When the Killing's Done is a 2011 novel by T. C. Boyle. The book is an environmental and family drama revolving around the Channel Islands of California—specifically Anacapa and Santa Cruz—and the controversy surrounding efforts by the National Park Service and its partners to eradicate invasive species and revitalize the islands' natural communities.

The novel has substantial basis in historical occurrence. Native wildlife populations on the islands, both part of Channel Islands National Park, had been pushed toward extinction by a variety of invasive species, including the golden eagle, black rats, and feral pigs and sheep. In 2001 and 2002 the National Park Service used poison to successfully eradicate Anacapa Island's non-native black rats,  and then partnered with other government agencies and the Nature Conservancy to remove feral pigs from Santa Cruz Island, which was completed in 2006.

In the novel, Dave Lajoy, an impassioned animal rights activist, leads an attempt to prevent NPS spokesperson and biologist Alma Boyd Takesue from removing rats and pigs from the islands. The novel also flashbacks to events on the islands during the 1940s and the 1970s.

References

External links
 T.C. Boyle official web site
 T.C. Boyle: When the Killing's Done - 2011 Interview with the author on Bookworm

2011 American novels
Novels by T. C. Boyle
Biographical novels
Channel Islands of California
Novels set in California
Viking Press books